The 2000 Men's World Outdoor Bowls Championship men's singles was held at Marks Park Bowling Club, in Johannesburg, South Africa, from 1 to 15 April 2000.

Jeremy Henry of Ireland won the gold medal.

Qualifying round

Section A

Section B

Finals

Results

References

Men